Sleep is a 1964 American avant-garde film by Andy Warhol. Lasting five hours and 20 minutes, it consists of looped footage of John Giorno, Warhol's lover at the time, sleeping.

The film was one of Warhol's first experiments with filmmaking, and was created as an "anti-film". Warhol would later extend this technique to his eight-hour-long film Empire.

Description

Sleep is a silent black-and-white film showing Giorno asleep. It is over five hours long, divided across five reels. Although the lack of action gives the illusion of continuity, the film is spliced together from many shorter shots.

The film's opening shot lasts only four-and-a-half minutes, but it is repeated six times. The rest of the reel uses six unique shots, first shown sequentially, then alternating between the first two, then looping the last four. The second reel uses three repeated shots of Giorno's buttocks and one repeated shot of his head. The third reel of Sleep uses only a single four-and-a-half minute shot of Giorno sleeping on his back, looped for an hour and a half. The fourth reel uses a single four-and-a-half minute close-up of Giorno's head looped for 86 minutes. The final reel has the most variation, with nine unique shots over 49 minutes. It is the only reel in which Warhol uses a fragment of a shot instead of including the shot in its entirety.

Production

Photography
Throughout mid-1963 Warhol spent weekends at a farmhouse at the Mallett Estate in Lyme, Connecticut, the summer home of gallery owner Eleanor Ward. There, he began shooting footage for Sleep. He used a Bolex 16 mm camera. This limited him to  reels that each lasted three minutes. He spent months trying to learn how to operate the camera effectively.  Warhol ultimately shot four hours of footage, although Sleep only uses around 30 minutes of it.

Post-production
Warhol took some of the shots and flipped the film stock such that light from the projector hit the base before the emulsion. Sarah Dalton, who had worked with Warhol on some of his silkscreens, edited the film. He instructed her to omit footage that contained too much motion and "try and make it more the same." To structure the shots in Sleep, Dalton put together storyboards of Giorno's figure. She repeated some of the shots for extended periods of time and assembled the footage. Although the film was shot at 24 frames per second, the standard speed for sound films, it is projected at the slower rate of 16 fps, an older standard for silent films.
Warhol put together an ad hoc soundtrack by having a radio play softly from a cinema balcony. However, he discontinued this practice after the first few screenings.

In 1964, La Monte Young provided a loud minimalist drone soundtrack to Sleep when shown as small TV-sized projections at the entrance lobby to the third New York Film Festival held at Lincoln Center.

Release
Sleep premiered on January 17, 1964, presented by Jonas Mekas, at the Gramercy Arts Theater in New York City as a fundraiser for the Film-Makers' Cooperative. Of the nine people who attended the premiere, two left during the first hour. Critics Jonas Mekas and Archer Winsten were in the audience, as well as Paul Morrissey, a friend of the projectionist Ken Jacobs; Morrissey later became a frequent collaborator with Warhol. When the Cinema Theatre in Los Angeles held a surprise screening of Sleep later in the year, audience members shouted at the screen and threatened to riot.

Images from the film appear in later artworks by Warhol. His 1965 sculpture Large Sleep uses two successive frames from the film, arranged vertically on a sheet of plexiglass. Another plexiglass sculpture uses three successive frames of Sleep, silkscreened in black ink, with a red image silkscreened on the other side. This work is now lost.

Reception
Film Culture voted to award Warhol its Independent Film Award for Sleep, Haircut, Eat, Kiss, and Empire.

Commemorating the fiftieth anniversary of Warhol's Sleep, Finnish filmmaker Juha Lilja created a remake of the film.

See also

 Andy Warhol filmography
 Blue Movie (1969) – Warhol film
 Eat (1964) – Warhol film
 Kiss (1963) – Warhol film
 List of American films of 1964
 List of longest films by running time

References

External links

 
Sleep at Warhol Stars
My 15 Minutes - John Giorno about his appearance in Sleep

1960s avant-garde and experimental films
1964 films
American avant-garde and experimental films
American black-and-white films
American silent feature films
Films about sleep
Films directed by Andy Warhol
Non-narrative films
One-character films
1960s American films